The 2021–22 season is Carlisle United's 117th season in their existence and eighth consecutive season in League Two. Along with the league, the club will also compete in the FA Cup, the EFL Cup and the EFL Trophy. The season covers the period from 1 July 2021 to 30 June 2022. 2022–23 Carlisle United F.C. season

Squad statistics

Top scorers

Disciplinary record

Notes:

Pre-season friendlies
Carlisle United confirmed they would play friendly matches against Penrith, Workington, Hebburn Town, Chorley, Kendal Town, Blackpool, Everton U23s, Lancaster City and FC Halifax Town as part of their pre-season preparations.

Competitions

League Two

League table

Results summary

Results by matchday

Matches
Carlisle's fixtures were confirmed on 24 June 2021.

FA Cup

Carlisle were drawn at home to Horsham in the first round and Shrewsbury Town in the second round.

EFL Cup

Carlisle United were drawn away to Sheffield United in the first round.

EFL Trophy

The Cumbrians were drawn into Northern Group A alongside Everton U21s, Hartlepool United and Morecambe. On July 6, U's group game matches were announced. In the knock-out stages, Carlisle were drawn away to Tranmere Rovers or Harrogate Town in the third round.

Cumberland Senior Cup

Carlisle were drawn against Langwathby United in the first round.

Transfers

Transfers in

Loans in

Loans out

Transfers out

References

Carlisle United
Carlisle United F.C. seasons